Zuck Bucks is a name reportedly given by employees to a possible in development digital currency by Meta Platforms. Alternatively, this refers to a cryptocurrency by the same name made to mock Meta Platforms previous attempts to create a successful cryptocurrency such as Diem.

References

Meta Platforms applications